Mmathethe is a village located in the Southern District of Botswana. It had 5,078 inhabitants at the 2011 census.

See also
 List of cities in Botswana

References

Populated places in Botswana